System Shock is an original novel written by Justin Richards and based on the long-running British science fiction television series Doctor Who. It features the Fourth Doctor, Sarah and Harry and is followed by the BBC Books Past Doctor Adventures novel Millennium Shock, also by Richards.

Plot
It is 1998, and the information age is about to take off. However, mysterious events are plaguing London. A prominent spy is killed. A hostage situation is bizarrely resolved. The Doctor receives a computer disc from a dead man. And to top it all off, it seems that an alien race is planning a takeover using Earth's ever expanding computer technology.

References

1995 British novels
1995 science fiction novels
Fiction set in 1998
Novels set in the 1990s
Virgin Missing Adventures
Fourth Doctor novels
Novels by Justin Richards
Novels set in London